Ijeoma Queenth Daniels (born 25 September 1992) is a Nigerian women's football defender, who plays for Trabzonspor in the Turkish Women's Football Super League.

Club career 
Daniels moved to Turkey in November 2015, and joined the Istanbul-based club Ataşehir Belediyespor to appear in the 2015–16 Women's First League season. She capped in eight games and scored one goal. The next season, she signed with Kireçburnu Spor, where she played eight matches only in one and half seasons. In the second half of the 2017–18 season, she transferred to İlkadım Belediyesi Yabancılar Pazarı Spor in Samsun, where she appeared in two matches. In the second half of the 2019-20 Turkish Women's First League season, she joined Adana İdmanyurduspor.  For the |2022–22 Turkish Women's Super League season, she joined Galatasaray S.K.. In the 2022–23 Turkish Women's Super League season, she transferred to Trabzonspor

Career statistics 
.

Injury 
On 4 December 2016, she was injured during a match, and after attempting to walk off the pitch, she was unable to. Aysun Aliyeva, a player of the opponent team 1207 Antalya Spor, although lighter than Daniels,  
took her on humpback and carried the injured woman in pain to the bench.

References 

Living people
1992 births
Nigerian women's footballers
Women's association football midfielders
Nigerian expatriate women's footballers
Nigerian expatriate sportspeople in Turkey
Expatriate women's footballers in Turkey
Ataşehir Belediyespor players
Kireçburnu Spor players
İlkadım Belediyespor players
Adana İdmanyurduspor players
Turkish Women's Football Super League players
Galatasaray S.K. women's football players
Trabzonspor women's players